The British Rail Class 375 is an electric multiple unit train that was built by Bombardier Transportation (previously Adtranz) at Derby Litchurch Lane Works, from 1999 to 2005. The class form part of the Electrostar family of units, which also includes classes 357, 376, 377, 378, 379 and 387, is the most numerous type of EMU introduced since the privatisation of British Rail.

These units form the basis of Southeastern's mainline fleet.

Description

Introduced into service in 2000, these trains are owned by Eversholt Rail Group (formerly HSBC Rail) and leased to Southeastern for operation from London to Kent and parts of East Sussex.

The Class 375 is the principal train used by Southeastern, and replaced the slam-door Mark 1 derived stock, which was more than 40 years old and did not meet modern health and safety requirements and replaced the 16 Class 365s which were transferred to WAGN in 2004. All units have been converted from Tightlock to Dellner couplers.

Refurbishment
In May 2015, unit 375301 was moved from Ramsgate Depot to Derby Litchurch Lane Works for a full refurbishment. On 16 May 2015, it was returned to the Kent depot wearing a new livery, similar to, but not based on the 'Highspeed' livery carried by the high speed Class 395 EMU, with a more vibrant shade of blue on the saloon doors and bolder stripes to highlight First Class and Disabled areas. Internally, the unit has received new carpets and lino flooring, new table top covers and the grab poles, side panels and table legs have been re-powder coated. The existing seat covers have been retained, but were dry cleaned to provide a brighter, cleaner interior. This work will also involve combining the two separate First Class sections on four car units into one section in the end of MOSL coach.  It is intended for all class 375 units to receive this refurbishment between 2015 and 2018. The original plan was for the first 50 units (375/3s, 375/6s and 375/7s) to be refurbished at Bombardier in Derby and then the remaining units would be transferred for refurbishment at Bombardier Ilford. This plan did not go ahead and the 375/8s and 375/9s were sent to Derby. On 19 September 2015 the last 375/3 unit no 375310 went to Derby for refurbishment. The following week on 26 September the first 375/6 went to Derby for refurbishment. The final 375 to receive the refurbishment and gain the new blue Southeastern livery was 375 920, which was returned to Ramsgate depot on 28 April 2018.

Accidents and incidents
 On 8 November 2010, a passenger train operated by unit 375 711 overran  station, on the Hastings Line in East Sussex, due to low railhead adhesion in the leaf fall season and maintenance errors in respect of the train's sanding apparatus. Following the incident, Southeastern reduced the interval that the sand hoppers were to be refilled from seven days to five days.
 On 24 November 2014, the front carriage of unit 375 611 caught fire from faulty electrical insulation pots at  Platform 6. There were no injuries, though both the track and leading carriage required repairs, part of the rail being melted.
The leading carriage of 375 703 was derailed. There were no injuries amongst the 70 passengers and crew on board.
 On 5 January 2018, unit 375 815 hit a fallen tree near Herne Bay. Though damage was sustained to the leading carriage, there were no injuries.
 On 24 October 2018, shortly before midnight unit 375 301 leading 375 906 hit a car abandoned on a level crossing between Teynham and Faversham. The car caught fire and the leading carriage of 375 301 sustained damage to its corridor, bogie and coupling.

Operations

Main lines
Class 375s work the following main line routes:
 Charing Cross – Tunbridge Wells and Hastings fast services
 Charing Cross – Dover Priory and Ramsgate via Ashford International.
 Victoria – Ramsgate and Dover Priory via Chatham
 Cannon Street - Ramsgate/Broadstairs via Chatham (peak hours only)

Outer suburban
Class 375s also work the following outer suburban Southeastern routes interchangeably with Class 465/9 units:
 Charing Cross – Tunbridge Wells
 Victoria – Ashford International and Maidstone East,
 Victoria - Dover Priory via Denmark Hill and Gillingham (Kent)
 Victoria - Canterbury East/Faversham (Sundays only)

Medway Valley Line
Class 375/3 Electrostar units started operating services on the Medway Valley Line from May 2012 to January 2016, and then from September 2016 to the present day. Previously Class 466 Networkers were the regular units on this line with the occasional Class 465 Networker or 4-car 375 Electrostar being used as a substitute. The Networkers are no longer used on this route as the Class 466s are now non-compliant with the new PRM-TSI law and the volume of traffic cannot support Class 465s or 4-car Class 375s/377s.
 Strood – Maidstone West/Paddock Wood/Tonbridge

Sheerness line
From December 2019, Class 375/3 units replaced Class 466 units on the Sheerness line due to the latter being non-compliant with the new PRM-TSI law.

Fleet details

References

Further reading

 

Adtranz multiple units
Bombardier Transportation multiple units
375
Train-related introductions in 2001
25 kV AC multiple units
750 V DC multiple units